The Convent Yard is situated in Riga, Latvia, and originates from the first half of the 13th century. It is some of the oldest part of Riga that has been preserved.

References 

Buildings and structures in Riga
Convent Yard